The 2021 Rugby League World Cup Final may refer to:
 2021 Men's Rugby League World Cup Final, a rugby league match to determine the winner of the 2021 Men's Rugby League World Cup
 2021 Women's Rugby League World Cup Final, a rugby league match to determine the winner of the 2021 Women's Rugby League World Cup
 2021 Wheelchair Rugby League World Cup Final, a rugby league match to determine the winner of the 2021 Wheelchair Rugby League World Cup
 2021 Physical Disability Rugby League World Cup Final, a rugby league match to determine the winner of the 2021 Physical Disability Rugby League World Cup

See also 
 2021 Rugby League World Cup (disambiguation)